Tom Capone (January 1, 1966 – September 2, 2004), born Luiz Antonio Ferreira Gonçalves, was a Brazilian music producer and guitar player. Born in Rio Negro/PR, Brazil, he died in Los Angeles hours after leaving the 2004 Latin Grammy Awards show when his motorcycle collided with a car.  He had been nominated for five Latin Grammy awards. His production for Maria Rita's eponymous debut won Latin Grammys for "New Star", MBP song: "A Festa" and "MPB Record of the Year".

References 

1966 births
2004 deaths
Motorcycle road incident deaths
Road incident deaths in California
Brazilian people of Italian descent
Brazilian record producers
Latin music record producers
Latin Grammy Award winners